Bradford UK City of Culture 2025 is a designation given to Bradford, England, between 2025 and 2029 by the Department for Digital, Culture, Media and Sport (DCMS). The designation means that Bradford gains access to funding to improve its infrastructure and arts facilities, and will host a series of events celebrating local culture starting in 2025 for twelve months. Bradford won the designation on 31 May 2022, winning over bids from County Durham, Southampton and Wrexham County Borough to become the fourth UK City of Culture since the programme began in 2013, following Derry~Londonderry, Hull, and Coventry, as well as the second in Yorkshire. The 2025 bidding contest was launched on 29 May 2021, and was the first contest since 2013 open to local areas in the United Kingdom receiving twenty bids by July 2021.

Background

UK City of Culture is a designation given to a different city every four years by the DCMS with the aim of using the arts to celebrate and regenerate forgotten areas.

Bidding and selection process

By the deadline at the end of July 2021, it was reported that a record number of twenty cities and areas had submitted bids to hold the title of UK City of Culture 2025, a quarter of which are from Wales. The then Secretary of State for Digital, Culture, Media and Sport, Oliver Dowden MP, stated that the sheer number of applicants for the title was a "testament to the huge success of City of Culture". The 2025 bidding competition has allowed for the first time, bids from regions and areas, including groups of towns across one or multiple local authorities, and even across the borders of the constituent countries. Those long-listed have been awarded £40,000 to support their bid progressing to the next stage of the competition. The holder was set to be announced in December 2021, but was postponed due to the number of applicants, with a longlist released on 8 October 2021, a final shortlist of bidders was released on 18 March 2022. Bradford was announced as the 2025 holder by Secretary of State for Digital, Culture, Media and Sport, Nadine Dorries on 31 May 2022, winning over the other shortlisted bids from County Durham, Southampton and Wrexham County Borough which all received £125,000 as runners-up. The competition was judged by Sir Phil Redmond, chair of the expert advisory panel for the UK City of Culture 2025 competition, who led visits to each bidder prior to the final announcement.

See also
Coventry UK City of Culture 2021 – the previous winner
European Capital of Culture – the scheme that inspired UK City of Culture

Notes

References

Events in the United Kingdom
2025 in the United Kingdom
Arts festivals in England